Stuart Newall (9 May 1843 – 3 August 1919) was a New Zealand soldier and military leader. He was a key player in the Dog Tax War.

See also  
 List of New Zealand units in the Second Boer War

References

1843 births
1919 deaths
New Zealand gold prospectors
People of the New Zealand Wars
People from Dumfries
New Zealand military personnel
Scottish emigrants to New Zealand
New Zealand Army officers